Sainte-Beuve-en-Rivière is a commune in the Seine-Maritime department in the Normandy region in northern France.

Geography
The A29 autoroute passes through the south-western part of the commune's territory.

Population

Places of interest
 The church of St. Beuve, dating from the twelfth century.

See also
Communes of the Seine-Maritime department

References

Communes of Seine-Maritime